An activity cycle diagram (ACD) is a graphical modeling tool to depict interactions among objects in a system.

Origin 
The ACD is a modeling tool that was developed in 1960 following the flow diagram method of K.D. Tocher. It pertains to the activity-based paradigm of system modeling, as opposed to process-oriented or event-based paradigms. The activity-based modeling is a natural way to represent the knowledge about a system in the activity paradigm of discrete event simulation.

Characteristics 
The activity cycle diagram is characterized by its focus on the life cycle of the components of a system, distinguishing for each component a "dead" state and an "active" state.

Implementation 
In activity-based modeling, the dynamics of system is represented as an ACD which is a network model of the logical and temporal relationships among the activities. An ACD is easily implemented with the activity scanning method of simulation execution.

External links
 INTRODUCTION TO DISCRETE EVENT SIMULATION
 MODEL DEVELOPMENT LIFE CYCLE
 ACTIVITY CYCLE DIAGRAMS
 SIMULATION USING ARENA
 ADVANCED SIMULATION USING ARENA
 SIMULATION OUTPUT ANALYSIS

Sources

Systems theory
Diagrams